The 8th Missouri Infantry Regiment may refer to:

 8th Missouri Infantry Regiment (Union), a Union regiment during the American Civil War
 8th Missouri Infantry Regiment (Confederate), a Confederate regiment during the American Civil War
 11th Missouri Infantry Regiment (Confederate), a Confederate regiment previously designated the 8th Missouri Infantry Regiment